The women's 1500 metres at the 2018 Commonwealth Games, as part of the athletics programme, took place in the Carrara Stadium on 9 and 10 April 2018.

Caster Semenya won the 1500 m Commonwealth Games title in a Games record and South African record time of 4:00.71 minutes. Her hyperandrogenic condition remained a point of controversy amongst her competitors, with Australian Brittany McGowan saying that it was "tough for a lot of women" to compare in performance.

Records
Prior to this competition, the existing world and Games records were as follows:

Schedule
The schedule was as follows:

All times are Australian Eastern Standard Time (UTC+10)

Results

First round
The first round consisted of two heats. The four fastest competitors per heat (plus four fastest losers) advanced to the final.

In addition, the track referee ruled that Zoe Buckman and Sarah McDonald were sufficiently impeded by Winny Chebet (who fell during the second heat) to merit being advanced to the final.

Heat 1

Heat 2

Final
The medals were determined in the final.

References

Women's 1500 metres
2018
2018 in women's athletics